EXEC 2 is an interpreted, command procedure control, computer scripting language used by the EXEC 2 Processor originally supplied with the CMS component of the IBM Virtual Machine/System Product (VM/SP) operating system.

Relation to EXEC
EXEC 2 is mostly compatible with CMS EXEC but EXEC 2 scripts must begin with an &TRACE statement. Some EXEC statements and predefined variables do not exist in EXEC 2, although in some cases there are analogs. There are some minor differences in some statements and predefined functions.

EXEC 2 has the following enhancements: 
 There is no 8-byte restriction on token length.
 Statements can be up to 255 characters long.
 EXEC 2 can issue commands to subcommand environments as well as CMS and CP.
 EXEC 2 has additional built-in functions.
 EXEC 2 has user-defined functions.
 EXEC 2 commands may include subroutines and functions.
 EXEC 2 has extra debugging facilities.
 CMS programs can manipulate EXEC 2 variables.

Some statemts of EXEC are not supported in EXEC 2, including:
 &BEGSTACK ALL
 &CONTROL
 &EMSG
 &END
 &GOTO TOP
 &HEX
 &PUNCH
 &SPACE
 &TIME

Some predefined variables of EXEC are not defined in EXEC2:
 &*
 &$
 &DISKX 
 &DISK* 
 &DISK? 
 &DOS 
 &EXEC 
 &GLOBAL 
 &GLOBALn
 &READFLAG 
 &TYPEFLAG

XEDIT Macros
XEDIT Macros are files with filetype XEDIT, whose contents are
written using the syntax of CMS EXEC, EXEC 2 or REXX. Like regular EXEC 2 "EXEC" command
files, they begin with a "&TRACE" statement, to distinguish them from CMS EXEC files.

History
Written in the 1970s and formally introduced for CMS with VM/SP Release 1, EXEC 2 was preceded by CMS EXEC and superseded by REXX.

All three command interpreters—CMS EXEC, EXEC 2 and REXX — continue to be supported by z/VM.

References

External links
 EXEC 2 Processor, CMS User's Guide, z/VM Version 5 Release 1.0, Program Number 5741-A05, Document Number SC24-6079-00, First Edition September 2004
 REX - A Command Programming Language, REX First Public Paper, SHARE 56, 18 Feb 1981

IBM mainframe operating systems
Scripting languages
VM (operating system)